Marconia (Marconij) is a town in the region of Basilicata, Italy with about 12,000 inhabitants. It is located in the Province of Matera and is considered a "frazione," or administrative district, of the nearby city of Pisticci.

Marconia was settled during Second World War period, like restrict colony, where live dissenter politicos forced to work.

Marconia is named for Guglielmo Marconi, an Italian 20th-century inventor, who inventing wireless communications (radio).

External links
https://www.regololab.com/
http://www.marconiashop.it/

Province of Matera